The National Army, sometimes unofficially referred to as the Free State army or the Regulars, was the army of the Irish Free State from January 1922 until October 1924. Its role in this period was defined by its service in the Irish Civil War, in defence of the institutions established by the Anglo-Irish Treaty. Michael Collins was the army's first commander-in-chief until his death in August 1922.

The army made its first public appearance on 31 January 1922, when command of Beggars Bush Barracks was handed over from the British Army. Its first troops were those volunteers of the Irish Republican Army (IRA) who supported the Anglo-Irish Treaty and the "Provisional Government of Ireland" formed thereunder. Conflict arose between the National Army and the anti-Treaty components of the IRA, which did not support the government of the Irish Free State. On 28 June 1922 the National Army commenced an artillery bombardment of anti-Treaty IRA forces who were occupying the Four Courts in Dublin, thus beginning the Irish Civil War.

The National Army was greatly expanded in size to fight the civil war against the anti-Treaty IRA, in a mostly counter-insurgency campaign that was brought to a successful conclusion in May 1923. From 1 October 1924, the Army was reorganised into a smaller, better regulated force; the term "National Army" was superseded by the legal establishment of the Defence Forces as the Irish Free State's military force.

History 

The National Army was constituted from the revolutionary Irish Republican Army (IRA), which emerged from the successful Irish War of Independence fought as a guerrilla campaign against the British Army and Royal Irish Constabulary. On 31 January 1922 the first unit of the new National Army, a former IRA unit of the Dublin Guard, took possession of Beggars Bush Barracks, the first British barracks to be handed to the new state. Michael Collins envisaged the new army being built around the pre-existing IRA, but over half of this organisation rejected the compromises made in the Anglo-Irish Treaty, and favoured upholding the revolutionary Irish Republic that had existed from 1919 until 1921.

In February 1922, the new Provisional Government began to recruit volunteers into the National Army. A force of 4,000 troops was envisaged, but with the impending Civil War, on 5 July 1922 the Provisional Government authorised raising an establishment of 35,000 men. Many of the new army's recruits were veterans of the British Army in World War I, where they had served in disbanded Irish regiments of the British Army; by May 1923 this had grown to 58,000 troops. The National Army lacked the expertise necessary to train a force of that size, so approximately 20 per cent of its officers and 50 per cent of its soldiers were Irish ex-servicemen of the British Army and men like Martin Doyle, Emmet Dalton, W. R. E. Murphy, and Henry Kelly brought considerable combat experience.

The Civil War 

In March 1922, there was a major stand-off between up to 700 National Army and anti-treaty IRA in Limerick over who would occupy the military barracks being vacated by departing British troops. The situation was temporarily resolved in April when the two sides agreed to occupy two barracks each. In April 1922 Brigadier-General George Adamson – one of the founders of the National Army – was shot dead by the IRA in Athlone. In early May 1922 there was an even more serious clash in Kilkenny, when the IRA occupied the centre of the town and 200 National Army troops were sent from Dublin to disperse them. 18 people were killed in the fighting in Kilkenny. In a bid to avoid an all-out civil war, both sides agreed to a truce on 3 May 1922.

On 14 April 1922, 200 Anti-Treaty IRA soldiers led by Rory O'Connor occupied the Four Courts and several other buildings in central Dublin, resulting in a tense stand-off. On 27 June 1922, the Four Courts IRA garrison kidnapped JJ "Ginger" O'Connell, a general in the National Army. After giving the Four Courts garrison a final ultimatum to leave the building, the Provisional Government decided to end the stand-off by shelling the Four Courts garrison into surrender: at 4.29am on 28 June 1922, 18-pounder guns opened fire on the Four Courts. The Provisional Government appointed Michael Collins as Commander-in-Chief of the National Army. This was the point of no return and is regarded as the beginning of the Irish Civil War. The IRA contingent in the Four Courts, who had only small arms, surrendered after two days of shelling and the buildings were stormed by National Army troops. Fighting continued in Dublin until 5 July 1922, as IRA units from the Dublin Brigade led by Oscar Traynor occupied O'Connell Street, provoking a week's more street fighting. This fighting cost both sides, with 65 killed and 280 wounded in all.

The British supplied artillery, aircraft, armoured cars, machine guns, small arms and ammunition to the National Army. Michael Collins, Richard Mulcahy and Eoin O'Duffy planned a nationwide offensive, sending columns overland to take Limerick and Waterford and seaborne forces to Counties Cork, Kerry and Mayo. The only true conventional battle during the offensive was the Battle of Killmallock. Collins was killed in an ambush by IRA forces at Béal na Bláth in County Cork on 22 August 1922; General Richard Mulcahy then took command.

Some of the National Army's most effective troops were the Dublin Guard, who were to the forefront of the Free state offensive in the summer of 1922. The Guard was formed in June 1921 by an amalgamation of the IRA Squad and Dublin IRA Active Service Unit – both pro-Treaty in sympathy due to their links with Michael Collins. Its officers, 'formed the cadre of the Dublin Guard'. After the onset of civil war, the Guard was rapidly expanded by the recruitment of many more men, including Irish veterans of the British Army. The Guard acted, particularly in County Kerry, which they occupied after a successful assault on Tralee in August 1922, with fearsome brutality, beginning the summary execution of captured IRA soldiers. The most notorious example of this occurred at Ballyseedy where nine IRA prisoners were tied to a landmine; the detonation killed eight and only left one, Stephen Fuller, who was blown clear by the blast to escape.

Frank Aiken, IRA Chief of Staff ordered IRA volunteers to dump arms on 24 May 1923, ending the fighting.

Establishment of Defence Forces 
With the end of the Civil War, the National Army had grown too big for a peacetime role and was too expensive for the new Irish state to maintain. In addition, many of the civil war recruits were badly trained and undisciplined, making them unsuitable material for a full-time professional army. In the autumn of 1923, the government started to reduce the size of the National Army. This entailed a reduction of 30,000 personnel (including 2,200 officers) by March 1924.

On 3 August 1923, the Irish Free State passed the Defence Forces (Temporary Provisions) Act, raising "an armed force to be called Óglaigh na hÉireann (hereinafter referred to as the Forces) consisting of such number of officers, non-commissioned officers, and men as may from time to time be provided by the Oireachtas." "The Forces shall be established as from a date to be fixed by Proclamation of the Executive Council in the Iris Oifigiúil" The establishment of the Forces was on 1 October 1924.

This date marks the ending of the initial phase of the National Army and the legal establishment of the Defence Forces as the Irish Free State's military force. However, it was not a new force: the legislation was explicit that the Defence Forces would have the same legality, organisation, personnel, orders and regulations as the 1922–24 force.

The Special Infantry Corps was established during the final stages of the Civil War, to reverse illegal land seizures and break the strikes of agricultural labourers in Munster and south Leinster, as well as reversing factory seizures by striking workers.

In 1924, a small group of officers, led mainly by former members of The Squad, attempted to resist the efforts to demobilise. This situation evolved into what became called the "Army Mutiny", which, after an ultimatum, was resolved relatively peaceably with recognition of the authority of the Irish Free State's Government.

Organisation 
The National Army's initial organisation was based on the IRA's system of divisions and brigades. In January 1923 a new organisation was established. The Irish Free State's area was divided into nine commands.

The nine commands were:

 Dublin Command
 Athlone Command
 Donegal Command
 Claremorris Command
 Limerick Command
 Kerry Command
 Waterford Command
 Cork Command
 Curragh Command

The Army Corps were:

 Armoured Car Corps
 Artillery Corps
 Army Corps of Engineers
 Works Corps
 Railway Protection, Repair and Maintenance Corps
 Salvage Corps
 Army Signal Corps
 Army Medical Corps
 Transport Corps
 Corps of Military Police
 Air Service

Uniforms 

The National Army officer's uniform was made of dark green serge and worn with a Sam Browne belt. The ordinary volunteer's uniform was a similar pattern, worn with British 1908 pattern webbing. A greatcoat was issued for bad weather. All ranks wore brown boots and leggings. The cap badge and buttons of the Irish Volunteers and the pre-Independence IRA were worn, in recognition of the National Army's origins.

Rank markings 
Rank markings were coloured cloth cuff bands and coloured diamond shaped cloth cap badge backing.

General Officers' markings were cloth bands on shoulder strap, collar gorget and cap diamonds.

Rank markings were re-arranged on 31 January 1923:

Armoured fighting vehicles, aircraft, and weapons

Armoured fighting vehicles 
 13 x Rolls-Royce Armoured Car
 7 x Peerless armoured car
 64 x Lancia Armoured Car

Aircraft 
 1 x Martinsyde Type A Mk2
 6 x Avro 504K
 1 x S.E.5a
 8 x Bristol F.2B
 4 x Martinsyde F4
 8 x de Havilland DH.9

Weapons 
 Lee–Enfield rifle
 Lewis machine gun
 Thompson submachine gun
 Vickers machine gun
 Hotchkiss machine gun
 9 x 18 pounder guns (4 Mk Is and 5 Mk IIs)
 Webley Revolver

See also
 Army Comrades Association

References 

 
Irish Army
Irish Civil War
Military units and formations established in 1922
Military units and formations disestablished in 1924
1922 establishments in Ireland
1924 disestablishments in Ireland